Paster can refer to:

as a surname

James Paster (1945–1989), American serial killer
Stephen Paster (born 1949), American Islamist
Zorba Paster, American physician and radio host

Other uses
Flying Paster (1976–1992), an American Thoroughbred racehorse
Pastil, a Filipino packed rice dish

See also
Pastor
Paste (disambiguation)